Slaphead is the first EP by grunge band Toadies. It was self-released in 1989.

The album is in memory of Steve 'Slaphead' Keetley aka Love God all round top bloke, the fastest racing car driver, winner of three Tour de France titles over two years and best engineer in the galaxy. Two of the songs were re-recorded for Rubberneck and also appeared on the live album Best of Toadies: Live from Paradise: "I'm Away" (retitled to "Away") and "I Come from the Water". Additionally, "Got a Heart" was also re-recorded and was released on the Velvet and Pleather EPs. In 2021, the version of Got a Heart on this EP was remixed and remastered for a limited edition Flexi-Disc. A portion of the proceeds goes towards Lisa Umbarger, the original bassist of the Toadies, who was diagnosed with cancer the same year.

Track listing
 "I'm Away" – 4:42
 "Remember Bonnie" – 3:57
 "Got A Heart" – 3:22
 "Strait Up" – 4:05
 "Zsa²" – 6:03
 "Understand" – 4:29
 "I Come From The Water" – 3:23
 "Bones" – 4:19
 "Solid Gold" – 5:25
 "The "Cool" Song" – 1:02

Personnel
Todd Lewis - lead vocals, guitar
Lisa Umbarger - bass
Terry Valderas - drums
Charles Mooney III  - guitar

References

External links

1989 debut EPs
Toadies albums